"You Are the Only One" is a song performed by Russian singer Sergey Lazarev. The song represented Russia in the Eurovision Song Contest 2016, and was written by Philipp Kirkorov and Dimitris Kontopoulos, the same team behind Ukraine's 2008 second place song; and John Ballard and Ralph Charlie. The song was released as a digital download on 5 March 2016 through State Television Company. On 28 July 2016, Lazarev released a Russian version of the song, entitled "Pust' ves' mir podozhdyot" ("Let The Whole World Wait"). He did a version the song in duet with Elena Paparizou during the Home concert series to replace the cancelled 2020 Contest.

Eurovision Song Contest

Sergey Lazarev was announced as the Russian entrant to the Eurovision Song Contest 2016 by Dutch media on 10 December 2015. The following day, it was announced that Lazarev's internal selection was decided upon by the editorial board of VGTRK with the executive producer of the Russia-1 channel, Gennady Gokhshtein, revealing that a song produced by Philipp Kirkorov had also been selected. The song was later released along with its music video which features Miss Universe Russia 2015 Vladislava Evtushenko on 5 March 2016. He performed in the first half of the first semi-final and qualified to perform in the final on May 14, where he finished third, winning the public televote.

Track listing

Charts

Release history

Cover versions
"You Are The Only One" was also recorded and released in 2019 by Nicki French who herself entered the Eurovision Song Contest 2000 for the United Kingdom. French's version appears on the EP "Let's Play That Song Again" with production by Matt Pop.

References

Eurovision songs of Russia
Eurovision songs of 2016
2016 songs
2016 singles
Songs written by John Ballard (record producer)
Songs written by Dimitris Kontopoulos
Songs written by Philipp Kirkorov
Sergey Lazarev songs
English-language Russian songs